Narom language (sometimes spelled Narum) is a Malayo-Polynesian language of the Lower Baram branch. It is spoken by some 2,420 Narom people in Sarawak, Malaysia, and particularly in the Miri Division and the area south of Baram River mouth, and maybe in Indonesia border areas with Malaysia. The language has three dialects, Bakong, Daliʼ and Miriʼ.

References

External links 

 Kaipuleohone has archived materials that include Miri kin terms and other written materials
 Kaipuleohone has also archived Narom audio recordings and fieldnotes of basic linguistic features in Narom

Berawan–Lower Baram languages
Languages of Malaysia
Endangered Austronesian languages